The 1992–93 Santa Clara Broncos men's basketball team represented Santa Clara University as a member of the West Coast Conference during the 1992-93 Season. Led by head coach Dick Davey, the Broncos finished with a record of 19-12, and a WCC record of 9-5. The Broncos beat Saint Mary's, Gonzaga, and Pepperdine to win the West Coast Conference tournament, and received an automatic bid into the NCAA tournament. Santa Clara became just the second #15 seed to win a game in the NCAA Tournament, beating Arizona in the first round before losing to Temple in the round of 32. It would be the first of three NCAA Tournament appearances in a 4-year period for the Broncos.

Roster

Schedule and results

|-
!colspan=9 style=| Regular Season

|-
!colspan=9 style=| WCC Tournament

|-
!colspan=9 style=| NCAA Tournament

References

Santa Clara Broncos men's basketball seasons
Santa Clara
1992 in sports in California
1993 in sports in California
Santa Clara